Bootlegs & B-Sides is a compilation album released by rap group, Luniz. 
Originally released in 1994 as the EP titled Formally Known as the LuniTunes paying homage to their original name of the group (it was rumored that Warner Brothers threatened them with a lawsuit if they refused to change their name due its likeness of the name of the cartoon Looney Tunes). It was an underground hit throughout Oakland and Richmond earning the Luniz a very loyal fanbase prior to the 1995 release of their first LP Operation Stackola. The album was re-released in summer of 1997 under the title Bootlegs & B-Sides as a jump-off to gain a buzz for the anticipated release of their second album Lunitik Muzik

Track listing
"Scandalous" - featuring Dru Down and Suga-T - 4:58 
"Doin' Dirt" - featuring Dru Down - 4:17
"Dirty Raps" - 4:17
"Scope" - 4:33 
"Just a Freak" - featuring Knucklehead - 4:45
"Stupid" - 4:38

Luniz albums
1997 compilation albums
B-side compilation albums